William Cahoon (January 12, 1774 – May 30, 1833) was an American judge and politician. He served as a U.S. representative from Vermont.

Biography
Cahoon was born in Providence in the Colony of Rhode Island and Providence Plantations to Daniel Cahoon Jr (1737-1811) and Lillis (Dyer) Cahoon (1740-1832). He attended the common schools. He moved with his parents to Lyndon, Vermont in 1791 and engaged in milling and agricultural pursuits. He was a member of the Vermont State House of Representatives from 1802 until 1810. He succeeded his father as town clerk in Lyndon, and served from 1808 until 1829.

Cahoon was a presidential elector in 1808 and voted for Madison and Langdon. He was appointed major general in the militia in 1808 and served during the War of 1812. From 1811 until 1819, Cahoon served as Caledonia County judge. He was a delegate to the Vermont State constitutional conventions in 1814 and 1828, and a member of the Vermont Governor's Council from 1815 until 1820.

From 1820 until 1821, Cahoon served as the Lieutenant Governor of Vermont. He was elected an Anti-Masonic candidate to the Twenty-first United States Congress and the Twenty-second United States Congress, serving from March 4, 1829 until March 3, 1833. He was an unsuccessful candidate in 1832 for reelection to Congress.

Personal life
Cahoon had two sons, George C. Cahoon and Edward A. Cahoon. Edward was a Vermont State Senator.

Death
Cahoon died on May 30, 1833 in Lyndon, Vermont. He is interred at the Lyndon Town Cemetery in Lyndon Center.

References

External links
 Biographical Directory of the United States Congress
 Information from the Vermont Archives
 
 Govtrack.us
 The Political Graveyard

1774 births
1833 deaths
Politicians from Providence, Rhode Island
Vermont Democratic-Republicans
Anti-Masonic Party politicians from Vermont
Anti-Masonic Party members of the United States House of Representatives from Vermont
Members of the Vermont House of Representatives
Burials in Vermont
Members of the United States House of Representatives from Vermont